In potential theory, a branch of mathematics, Cartan's lemma, named after Henri Cartan, is a bound on the measure and complexity of the set on which a logarithmic Newtonian potential is small.

Statement of the lemma
The following statement can be found in Levin's book.

Let μ be a finite positive Borel measure on the complex plane C with μ(C) = n.  Let u(z) be the logarithmic potential of μ:

Given H ∈ (0, 1), there exist discs of radii ri such that

and

for all z outside the union of these discs.

Notes

Complex analysis